The Scottish National Badminton Championships is a tournament organised to crown the best badminton players in Scotland. The tournament started in 1908 playing only mixed doubles and men's doubles.

Past winners

References
Results
badmintoneurope.com

Badminton in Scotland
National badminton championships
Badminton tournaments in Scotland
Recurring sporting events established in 1908
1908 establishments in Scotland